Karl Parts VR I/1, VR II/2, VR II/3 (15 July 1886 in Palupera Commune, Estonia – 1 September 1941 in Kirov, Soviet Union) was an Estonian military commander during the Estonian War of Independence.

In 1915, he graduated from Peterhof Military School, and participated in World War I. In July 1917, Parts joined the Estonian national units. During the German occupation in 1918, he organized the underground Estonian Defence League. In the Estonian Liberation War, Karl Parts led and organized the armoured trains, and in December 1918, became the commander of the Armoured Trains Division. He commanded in the biggest armoured conflict of war that resulted in the capture of Pskov. After the war, Parts served as commander of the Armoured Trains Brigade from 1921–1923, and later as inspector. He actively participated in defeating the 1924 coup attempt. In 1925, he retired and became a farmer. In 1940, Soviet occupation authorities arrested Parts, and he was shot in imprisonment the year after.

See also 
Estonian War of Independence
Freikorps in the Baltic

References
 Ülo Kaevats et al. 2000. Eesti Entsüklopeedia 14. Tallinn: Eesti Entsüklopeediakirjastus, 

1886 births
1941 deaths
People from Elva Parish
People from Kreis Dorpat
Members of the Estonian Provincial Assembly
Military personnel of the Russian Empire
Russian military personnel of World War I
Estonian military personnel of the Estonian War of Independence
Recipients of the Cross of Liberty (Estonia)
Estonian people executed by the Soviet Union
People who died in the Gulag